The Rover Incident ( or ) occurred on 12 March 1867 when the American merchant ship Rover, captained by Joseph Hunt who was accompanied by his wife Mercy G. Beerman Hunt, and en route from Shantou to Niuzhuang, was wrecked off the coast of Taiwan, then ruled by the Qing dynasty. The ship struck a coral reef called Qixingyan near Cape Eluanbi and drifted into the area of Kenting in modern-day Hengchun, Pingtung County, Taiwan. Fourteen American sailors, including Hunt and his wife, were killed by Taiwanese Aborigines in revenge for earlier killings of Kaolut (Koalut/Ku-a-lut/etc) tribe members by foreigners. Subsequently, the U.S. military decided to send a military expedition against the tribe members responsible.

American reaction

Following the wreck of the United States ship and killing of the surviving crew by aborigines, the American Consul to Amoy Charles William Le Gendre quickly traveled to Fuzhou, arriving on 2 April 1867, to persuade the Viceroys of Fujian and Zhejiang to intervene and put pressure on the Chinese authorities in Taiwan to resolve the issue. The Viceroy of Fujian gave Le Gendre permission to go to Taiwan himself and wrote him a letter of introduction to take to the prefect of Taiwan asking him to cooperate with Le Gendre; but the Viceroy also added that "if the consul takes measures to manage the case himself, please invite him not to do so, for these savages might give him more trouble that he thinks." Le Gendre commissioned the United States steamer , under the command of Captain John C. Febiger, in order to visit the scene of the wreck and to try (unsuccessfully) to get foreign officials in Taiwanfu (Taiwan's capital), where he arrived on 18 April) to act. After a subsequent failed punitive expedition carried out by Rear Admiral Henry H. Bell of the United States Navy, Le Gendre again returned to Taiwan—this time without any reference to his superiors. While in Taiwan, he asserted United States consular authority, selected a deputy consul in north Taiwan, visited the Keelung mines, and gathered information from United States merchants.

On June 19, one hundred and eighty-one officers, sailors, and marines provided with four days' rations and water landed in Taiwan under Commander George Belknap of the  who was accompanied by Lieutenant Commander Alexander Slidell MacKenzie, fleet lieutenant as second in command. In the terrible heat, it was "almost impossible to conduct operations in the middle of the day, and many of the party were attacked by sunstroke. The savages, who had taken up a position in the jungle behind rocks and other places invisible...kept up a heavy fire whenever their foes appeared." MacKenzie received a mortal wound to his chest from enemy fire. The American force was "compelled to withdraw in some confusion to the ships and soon departed from the island".

The marines were under the command of Captain James Forney, who submitted the following report to Commander Belknap, dated on board the flagship Hartford, at sea, June 17:
"I have the honor herewith to submit a brief report of the part taken by the Marines on the 13th inst., on the island of Formosa. On the first landing, by your order, I took charge of twenty Marines, deploying them forward as skirmishers. A dense and almost impenetrable thicket of bush prevented the men from advancing very rapidly. I penetrated with them to a creek about half a mile from the beach without meeting any of the enemy, and was then recalled for further orders. You then instructed me to leave a sergeant and five men on the beach, and to advance with the main body, headed by yourself. In consequence of all further operations coming under your own observation, I have nothing further to report, except that the men behaved gallantly, and deserve credit for the manner in which they marched over such a rough and hilly country, and under such intense, scorching heat...

The Rover Incident played a critical role U.S. military history in terms of shaping the U.S. Marine Corps' "rules of engagement" in "small wars."

Second visit
Upon return to South China, Le Gendre managed to persuade the Viceroy in Fuzhou to send a military force to Southern Taiwan. The force, significantly smaller than the 400 to 500 soldiers recommended by Le Gendre, was dispatched on 25 July 1867. Le Gendre then personally requested a gunboat from Admiral Bell, which he was denied, and eventually managed to commission the steamship Volunteer. He embarked for Taiwan on 4 September 1867 telling his superiors that "I am going there as a mere spectator.. . . I have no jurisdiction over the Chinese forces."

Le Gendre quickly assumed de facto command of the mission from General Liu in the course of a long and difficult march into deep aboriginal lands in southern Taiwan (some of which required extensive road construction). Then, with the aid of William A. Pickering and James Horn, Le Gendre negotiated a Memorandum of the Understanding with Tauketok  (南岬之盟) guaranteeing the safety of shipwrecked American and European sailors with Tok-a-Tok (1874), the chief of 18 Paiwan aboriginal tribes in the area when the Rover had gone ashore.

Influence
Following the Rover Incident in 1867, another shipwreck triggered the Mudan Incident which subsequently was the justification for the Empire of Japan to invade and occupy a part of Taiwan in 1874, a decade later the French General Jacques Duchesne defeated the Chinese up the Keelung River. In addition, the Qing court established the Hengchun lighthouse (1888; now Eluanbi Lighthouse) for the protection of the Taiwan Strait and vessels transiting the Bashi Channel.

TV Mini Series from 2021 
In 2021 Public Television Service (PTS) of Taiwan has released a ten part mini-series named Seqalu: Formosa 1867 ( 斯卡羅) about the incident. Seqalu refers to the name of a Paiwan-Puyuma nation that existed from 1600 to 1931.

See also
 Mudan incident
 Small Wars Manual
 Taiwan Expedition of 1874
 Formosa Expedition of 1867
 Princess Babao Temple

Notes

References

Citations

Bibliography

 

Merchant ships of the United States
Individual sailing vessels
Shipwrecks in the Pacific Ocean
Tall ships of the United States
Maritime incidents in March 1867
1867 in Taiwan
China–United States military relations
Taiwan–United States military relations
History of Taiwan
Taiwanese aboriginal culture and history
Combat incidents
March 1867 events